Dover District Council is the local authority for the Dover District in Kent, England. The council is elected every four years.

Political control
The first election to the council was held in 1973, initially operating as a shadow authority before coming into its powers on 1 April 1974. Political control of the council since 1973 has been held by the following parties:

Leadership
The leaders of the council (formally the chair of the policy and resources committee prior to 2001) have been:

Council elections
1973 Dover District Council election
1976 Dover District Council election
1979 Dover District Council election (New ward boundaries)
1983 Dover District Council election
1987 Dover District Council election (District boundary changes took place but the number of seats remained the same)
1991 Dover District Council election
1995 Dover District Council election
1999 Dover District Council election
2003 Dover District Council election (New ward boundaries reduced the number of seats by 11)
2007 Dover District Council election
2011 Dover District Council election
2015 Dover District Council election
2019 Dover District Council election (New ward boundaries reducing number of seats from 45 to 32)

Borough  result maps

By-election results

1999-2003

2003-2007

2007-2011

2011-2015

2015-2019

2019-2023

References

 By-election results

External links
Dover District Council

 
Council elections in Kent
District council elections in England